Alonewalk is the third album released by Dave Couse since the breakup of A House, his second on 1969 Records. It was mastered by Bob Ludwig and features a duet with Cathal Coughlan on the song "Good Friday". The album was released on Good Friday (April 2) in 2010. All songs are written by Dave Couse.

Track listing
 "Black and White"
 "Dark Blue"
 "Don't Say a Word"
 "Good Friday"
 "Habitual"
 "What Will Become of Us?"
 "All Tomorrows"
 "Time"

External links
Dave Couse Website
1969 Records

2010 albums
Dave Couse albums